Nicolás Jarry was the defending champion but chose not to defend his title.

Camilo Ugo Carabelli won the title after defeating Thiago Agustín Tirante 6–2, 7–6(7–4) in the final.

Seeds

Draw

Finals

Top half

Bottom half

References

External links
Main draw
Qualifying draw

Lima Challenger - 1
2022 Singles